Hilgard Mountain is a summit in Sevier County, Utah, in the United States. The summit is in the Fishlake National Forest.

It was named for Julius Erasmus Hilgard, former superintendent of the United States Coast and Geodetic Survey.

References

External links
 

Mountains of Utah
Mountains of Sevier County, Utah